Kusel-Altenglan is a Verbandsgemeinde ("collective municipality") in the district of Bad Dürkheim, in Rhineland-Palatinate, Germany. The seat of the Verbandsgemeinde is in Kusel. It was formed on 1 January 2018 by the merger of the former Verbandsgemeinden Kusel and Altenglan.

The Verbandsgemeinde Kusel-Altenglan consists of the following Ortsgemeinden ("local municipalities"):

 Albessen
 Altenglan
 Bedesbach
 Blaubach
 Bosenbach
 Dennweiler-Frohnbach
 Ehweiler
 Elzweiler
 Erdesbach
 Etschberg
 Föckelberg
 Haschbach am Remigiusberg
 Herchweiler
 Horschbach
 Körborn
 Konken
 Kusel
 Neunkirchen am Potzberg
 Niederalben
 Niederstaufenbach
 Oberalben
 Oberstaufenbach
 Pfeffelbach
 Rammelsbach
 Rathsweiler
 Reichweiler
 Ruthweiler
 Rutsweiler am Glan
 Schellweiler
 Selchenbach
 Thallichtenberg
 Theisbergstegen
 Ulmet
 Welchweiler

Verbandsgemeinde in Rhineland-Palatinate